The 1969 Paris Open, also known as the French Covered Court Championships,  was a professional men's tennis tournament played on indoor carpet courts at the Stade Coubertin in Paris, France. It was the 1st edition of the Paris Open (later known as the Paris Masters) and was held from 5 November until 11 November 1969. Third-seeded Tom Okker won the singles title.

Finals

Singles

 Tom Okker defeated  Butch Buchholz 8–6, 6–2, 6–1
 It was Okker's 8th singles title of the year and the 12th of his career in the open era.

Doubles
 John Newcombe /  Tony Roche defeated  Tom Okker /  Marty Riessen 10–8, 6–4, 6–2

References

External links 
 ATP tournament details